was a Japanese statesman and a member of the Fujiwara clan who was highly significant in determining the course of 12th century Japanese political history.

Early life
Born in 1120, Yorinaga had a turbulent youth. He later wrote that he did not listen to his elders and would spend most of his time roaming through the country, hawking and hunting - he said he still bore the scars of these expeditions at the time of writing. Despite this, he did proceed to begin studying, particularly the classics of Chinese literature and Confucianism, as well as Indian logic. He read little or no native Japanese works, however, and was later notable for never composing a poem in Japanese. 
He was the favourite son of his father, Tadazane.

Career
Yorinaga ascended quickly through the political ranks, achieving the formidable office of Minister of the Right (Udaijin) by the age of 17. In 1150, he was appointed Minister of the Left, or Sadaijin, the highest rank under the Chancellor and the Regent himself.  He married his daughter to Emperor Konoe in the same year.

Yorinaga was a determined defender of the Fujiwara Regency, known for his courageous and obstinate opposition to the 'new men' of the Insei system, though he appreciated the necessity of reforming the Regency. He implemented various political reforms during his career: for example, during his term as Sadaijin he reviewed defunct Court practices and observations, viewing them as a deplorable lapse in officials' discipline.

He was known for being overly firm and direct, even impetuous. The Gukanshō termed him as the finest scholar in Japan, but possessed of rash temperament. Some scholars have suggested that this was due to his lack of knowledge of Japanese literature and hence of native sentiment - his attitude was at odds with that of the easygoing Heian court.
His opponents called him the Aku Safu, or 'Wicked Minister of the Left', due to his passionate reform and strength of character.

Konoe's death in 1155 resulted in a hard-fought succession dispute. Yorinaga and his brother, Tadamichi, were divided over the issue. Bifukumon-In asserted her daughter's right to the Throne, but Japanese society was no longer accepting of a female sovereign, and nothing resulted from the claim. Tadamichi was triumphant, and the Emperor Toba's son, Go-Shirakawa, succeeded to the Throne. Yorinaga then asked to tutor the heir apparent, a reasonable request given his academic standing, but was denied.

Hogen Insurrection
Both of them insulted by Go-Shirakawa's faction, Yorinaga joined with Sutoku, one of Toba’s other sons, in opposition to him. Successfully gathering several hundred soldiers from adjacent provinces, they marched on the capital. They successfully captured the city and readied defences to repel a counter-attack. Go-Shirakawa had the support of the two foremost warrior clans of the day, the Minamoto and the Taira - consequently, his forces vastly outnumbered those of Yorinaga and Sutoku. The ensuing battle took place during the night. After heavy fighting, Yorinaga and Sutoku's defensive position was destroyed by fire. Yorinaga was killed, along with fifty of Sutoku's important supporters. The rest of their allies surrendered.

This defeat symbolised the true end of the Fujiwara's power over the capital and the rise of the warrior clans. It had been they who decided the outcome of the succession dispute, and their importance would only continue to grow for the next several centuries.

Family
He had two sons: Fujiwara no Moronaga (1138-1192), who served as Daijo-daijin, and Fujiwara no Kanenaga (1138-1158).

He also adopted the daughter of Fujiwara no Kin'yoshi, Fujiwara no Masuko.

Sexuality 

He had a physical relationship with many aristocratic men such as Fujiwara no Narichika, and recorded it in a diary called 'Taiki.'
However, 'Taiki' does not exist.

References

Fujiwara clan
1120 births
1156 deaths
Bisexual men
Japanese bisexual people
People of Heian-period Japan
Deified Japanese people